The Legislative Assembly of Kirov Oblast is the regional parliament of Kirov Oblast, a federal subject of Russia. A total of 40 deputies are elected for five-year terms.

Elections

2021

References

Kirov Oblast
Politics of Kirov Oblast